'Salem's Lot is a 1975 novel by Stephen King.

Salem's Lot may also refer to:

 Salem's Lot (1979 miniseries)
 Salem's Lot (2004 miniseries)
 Salem's Lot (radio drama)
 Salem's Lot (film)
The fictional town of Jerusalem's Lot

See also 
 A Return to Salem's Lot